Hanna Rebecka Zajc (born 15 February 1987 in Malmö) is a female Swedish Taekwondo practitioner. She attended at the 2008 Summer Olympics in Beijing and was ranked in 7th place. Zajc lives in Malmö in the south of Sweden and competes for KFUM Poeun.

References

1987 births
Taekwondo practitioners at the 2008 Summer Olympics
Olympic taekwondo practitioners of Sweden
Living people
Swedish female taekwondo practitioners
European Taekwondo Championships medalists
Sportspeople from Malmö
21st-century Swedish women